Carqueiranne (or) is a commune in the Var department,  administrative region of Provence-Alpes-Côte d'Azur (historically Provence), Southeastern France.

It is known now as a tourist seaside resort with good windsurfing nearby, at Almanarre Beach.

Demographics

Saint Exupéry
The town has a literary claim to fame as well. In early August 1944, an unidentifiable body wearing French military colours was found near here, which was long believed to be that of famous novelist Antoine de Saint Exupéry, author of The Little Prince.

In 1998, a bracelet known to be his, with a fragment of cloth still attached, was found in the sea east of Riou Island (south of Marseille). In 2000, a crashed P-38 Lightning was found in the seabed off the coast of Marseille, near where the bracelet was found, and it was confirmed to be the one that St. Exupéry was flying.

See also
Communes of the Var department

References

External links

Official site
 

Communes of Var (department)
Populated coastal places in France